Smith Creek is a stream in the U.S. state of Nevada.

Smith Creek was named in 1859 after a family which settled near its course. A variant name is "Smiths Creek".

References

Rivers of Lander County, Nevada
Rivers of Nevada